Catherine of Bohemia (19 August 1342 – 26 April 1395) also known as Catherine of Luxembourg was Electress of Brandenburg, the second daughter of Holy Roman Emperor Charles IV and Blanche of Valois.

Catherine was born on 19 August 1342, the third child and second surviving daughter of Charles IV, Holy Roman Emperor, and his first wife Blanche of Valois. On 13 July 1356, Catherine married Rudolf IV, Duke of Austria. The marriage was a political one arranged by her father to make peace with Austria. Rudolph died after nine years of childless marriage.

On 19 March 1366, Catherine married Otto V, Duke of Bavaria.

Ancestors

External links

House of Luxembourg
1342 births
1395 deaths
Bohemian princesses
Austrian royal consorts
Electresses of Brandenburg
14th-century Bohemian women
14th-century Bohemian people
14th-century House of Habsburg
14th-century Austrian women
Daughters of kings
Daughters of emperors
Burials at St. Stephen's Cathedral, Vienna
Children of Charles IV, Holy Roman Emperor
Remarried royal consorts